Charleswood is a semi-rural residential community and neighbourhood in the southwest corner of Winnipeg, Manitoba, Canada. Since at least the 1930s, Charleswood has been known as "The Suburb Beautiful."
It composes part of the city ward of Charleswood - Tuxedo - Westwood; and is part of the provincial electoral district of Roblin (replacing the former electoral district of Charleswood). It is also served by the Pembina Trails School Division.

It is located in the southwestern part of the city, and is bordered by the Assiniboine River to the north, Wilkes Avenue to the south, the Rural Municipality of Headingley on the west, and the Assiniboine Park and Forest to the east. Until it joined with the City of Winnipeg in 1972, it was a separate municipality known as the Rural Municipality of Charleswood. Its population as of the 2011 Census was 25,679.

History
Before European settlement, the region was home to an ancient ford across the Assiniboine River.

Patrick H. Kelly (1847–1940) is widely regarded as the founder of what is now Charleswood. He built a general store in 1907; was key in establishing the community's first post office; and was instrumental in developing the community's school. He also convinced the Winnipeg Electric Railway Company to extend the street railway so that the community had a connection with the city.

Kelly eventually came to persuade residents of the community to apply for the creation of Charleswood as a separate municipality. The origin of the name "Charleswood" is unclear, as it has at least two possibilities: it may have been named for Charles Kelly, who served on the first municipal council; or it is a combination of the Parish name "St. Charles" and the dense woodland that encompassed the area.

Kelly was successful and the Rural Municipality of Charleswood was incorporated on 15 February 1913. The municipality was formed from parts of the RM of Assiniboia and Parishes of Headingley and St. Charles, while excluding territories held by the Town of Tuxedo and the City of Winnipeg. The first four meetings of the new municipal council were held in a room in his store.

During the 1910s, the area was marketed as "Rydal," a prospective residential locale by the developers of Tuxedo. There was little housing in Charleswood before 1920 and only limited growth between 1920 and 1946. The local economy at the time was chiefly agricultural with dairy and poultry farms, market gardens, and mink ranchers. Following World War II, it became popular with immigrants from Europe who wanted to avoid living too close to the centre of Winnipeg. Development of the area increased, and new houses were constructed in the Roblin Park, Marlton, and Varsity View neighbourhoods. A ferry service was in operation in the region as late as 1958, and a trail leading to the ford was visible until fairly recently. The area experienced particularly strong growth in the 1970s, with at least 7,500 homes built during that decade.

In 1972, the Rural Municipality of Charleswood was among several municipalities that amalgamated into the City of Winnipeg. With Headingley seceding in 1992, the former municipalities on the north and south sides of the Assiniboine River—Charleswood and St. James-Assiniboia, respectively—were reunited as the Assiniboia Community. In 1995, the Charleswood Bridge opened over the Assiniboine River, physically connecting the two communities.

Sports
Charleswood is home to the Charleswood Hawks hockey team playing out of the MMJHL. It is also home to the Charleswood Curling Club, home club of 6 time provincial, 2 times national, and 1996 world curling champion Jeff Stoughton.

Crime
Charleswood has very low crime rates. The table below shows the crime rates of various crimes in each of the Charleswood neighborhoods. The crime data spans 5 years from the year 2017 to the year 2021. The rates are crimes per 100,000 residents per year.

See also
List of rural municipalities in Manitoba

References 

Former municipalities now in Winnipeg
Populated places disestablished in 1972
Neighbourhoods in Winnipeg
Charleswood